St. Peter and St. Paul's Church of Wissembourg is frequently, but incorrectly, referred to as the second largest Gothic church of Alsace after Strasbourg Cathedral. However, the building, with its interior ground surface area of  most probably is the second largest Gothic church in Bas-Rhin which is one of the two departments of the Alsace region. The former abbey church (abbatiale) of Wissembourg's famous Benedictine abbey now serves as the main Roman Catholic parish church of the town.

The church displays a Romanesque bell tower, the sole remain of the church built in the 11th century under the direction of abbot Samuel, and is thus a station on the Route Romane d'Alsace. The major part of the currently visible church is the work of builders under the command of abbot Edelin, in the late 13th century. During the 14th and 15th century, the church was richly decorated with stained glass, sculptures and mural paintings but only parts of the former abundance of works survived the vandalism which occurred during the French Revolution; of the surviving stained glass, what is not seen in the church itself can be found in Strasbourg's  Musée de l’Œuvre Notre-Dame.

Among the church's remaining treasures features a pipe organ, built by Louis Dubois in 1766 in one of the largest baroque organ cases in Alsace. When this organ had become barely playable, another organ was installed in the south transept in 1953, in a design typical of its time. The Dubois organ was restored in its (almost) original state between 2010 and 2012.

Located in the south transept of the abbey, the new organ, built buy Roethinger on the principles and aesthetics of the 1950s was taken up in 1989 by Yves Koenig.  It remained totally authentic and is therefore a valuable witness of the organ building at the middle of the twentieth century.

An spacious and ornate but unfinished 15th century cloister in Late Gothic style and an adjacent Romanesque Chapter house (12th century) now serving as a lateral chapel are the only other remains of the monastery where Otfrid of Weissenburg once studied and taught.

Gallery

References 

Wissembourg PeterPaul
Wissembourg PeterPaul
Wissembourg PeterPaul
Wissembourg PeterPaul
Wissembourg PeterPaul
Wissembourg PeterPaul